Rucka's World is the sixth studio album by Israeli-American parody rapper Rucka Rucka Ali. The album was released on September 11, 2012, and distributed by Pinegrove Records. It peaked at number 8 on the Billboard Top Comedy Albums.

Background
Similarly to Rucka Rucka Ali's previous albums, this album contains mostly parodical songs, and some of the songs were released as singles as well as part of the album.

Track listing

Charts

References

Comedy albums by American artists
Rucka Rucka Ali albums
2012 albums
2010s comedy albums